Atiba Hutchinson (born 8 February 1983) is a Canadian professional soccer player who plays as a midfielder and captains both Süper Lig club Beşiktaş and the Canada national team. While playing in Denmark he won the Danish Super Liga Player of the Year, becoming the first North American player to receive the award. That same season, Hutchinson won the first of six Canadian Player of the Year awards. Between 2010 and 2013, he played for PSV Eindhoven in the Dutch Eredivisie.

In 2012 as part of the Canadian Soccer Association's centennial celebration, he was named to the all-time Canada XI men's team. Hutchinson is Canada's record cap holder and the first male Canadian soccer player to reach over 100 caps.

Club career

Early career
Hutchinson was born in Brampton, Ontario, to Trinidadian parents. He began playing youth soccer at age four for Brampton Youth SC and later played youth soccer for North Scarborough SC and Woodbridge Strikers. Following a March 2001 trial at Schalke 04 in Germany, Hutchinson began his professional career in the 2002 summer season, playing briefly with the York Region Shooters of the Canadian Professional Football League before signing with the Toronto Lynx of the then A-League in mid-season, on 26 July, and playing in the team's final four games.

Öster
In January 2003 he signed with Östers IF, newly promoted to the Swedish Allsvenskan. Hutchinson scored six times for Öster during the 2003 season. With the club relegated out of the Allsvenskan, Hutchinson was granted a transfer for an estimated £1.32 million and signed with Helsingborgs IF in January 2004.

Helsingborg
Expectations were high for him the first season in Helsingborg, but they were ultimately unsatisfied. However, in the 2005 season he was consistently the team's best player, scoring six goals from a primarily defensive midfield position.

Copenhagen
Hutchinson moved to Danish club F.C. Copenhagen, where, for the first half of the year, he played alongside Swedish international Tobias Linderoth in central midfield, latterly being used around the midfield and as a striker. Manager Ståle Solbakken said in an interview with the football paper TIPS-bladet, that he saw Hutchinson's attacking talents as being too impressive for a central midfielder, saying that he would be used more often as winger. He was linked with Premier League clubs several times.

After Hutchinson had left Denmark for his new team in the Eredivisie he was awarded Danish Super Liga Player of the Year for his last season with Copenhagen. This award was given on 15 November 2010 by Franz Beckenbauer at the annual Danish Football Association award show. This was the first time a Canadian had won this award in the Danish League.

In 2014, 32,000 fans participated in a fan vote selecting their 11 all-time favourite Copenhagen players, selecting Hutchinson in the midfield.

PSV
On 22 April 2010, Hutchinson signed a three-year contract with PSV Eindhoven joining them on a free transfer. Atiba made his PSV debut in a 6–0 home victory against De Graafschap on 14 August 2010. Four days later he made his European debut for the team in a surprising 1-0 first leg defeat to FC Sibir Novosibirsk in the Europa League, however PSV won the second leg 5–0 making it to the next stage of the competition. Atiba scored his first goal with the Dutch side on 23 January 2011, his goal came in the 46th minute of a 3–0 away victory against VVV-Venlo. Hutchinson started the 2010 season playing a defensive role as a right back, however with the mid-season transfer of Ibrahim Afellay to Barcelona allowed Hutchinson to move into his more natural position of the central midfield. Atiba continued to impress through the winter scoring his second goal of the season in a 3–2 away victory against Excelsior on 5 March 2011. Atiba also help lead PSV to the Quarter Finals of the Europa League before being knocked out by Benfica in mid-April losing 6–3 on aggregate.

Hutchinson was forced to miss the beginning of the 2011–12 Eredivisie due to his knee injury sustained with Canada at the Gold Cup that summer. After missing the first two games of the season Hutchinson made his return on 21 August 2011 as a second-half substitute for Zakaria Labyad against ADO Den Haag, the game ended in a 3–0 away victory for PSV. Weeks later Hutchinson sustained yet another knee injury during a 2014 FIFA World Cup qualification against Saint Lucia forcing him to have his third knee operation in 18 months. Despite this, he started the KNVB Cup final for PSV against Heracles Almelo, which PSV won.

With PSV's summer addition of Mark van Bommel Hutchinson was moved back to defense playing right back. On 26 August 2012, he scored his first goal of the new season courtesy of a Dries Mertens through ball in the 38th minute, the game ended in a 3–1 away victory over FC Groningen.

Beşiktaş

With a desire to sign for a Premier League club, Hutchinson let his contract run out with PSV and went into the summer of 2013 looking for a new team, but on 31 July it was announced that he had joined Beşiktaş in the Süper Lig on a two-year deal. Hutchinson scored his first goal for the club on 23 March 2014 in a 3–0 victory over Akhisar Belediyespor. After missing the first leg in the 2014–15 UEFA Champions League play-off round Hutchinson had a standout performance against Arsenal in which Arsène Wenger said Hutchinson was the most impressive Besiktas player; the game ended in a 1–0 away defeat for the Turkish side.

During the summer of 2015, Hutchinson signed a two-year extension with Beşiktaş. In the 2015–16 Süper Lig season, Hutchinson was rewarded with another hard fought honour as Beşiktaş triumphed in the league campaign, which was successfully repeated in the 2016–17 Süper Lig season, again with Hutchinson in a key playmaking defensive midfielder role.

In August 2018, Hutchinson signed a one-year new contract with the club, which had a clause to extend the contract a further season if certain performance criteria are met. During the 2019–20 season, Hutchinson reached 200 league appearances with Beşiktaş.

On 15 August 2020, Hutchinson signed another extension with Beşiktaş that will keep him with the club through the end of the 2020–21 season.

On 6 July 2021, Hutchinson signed another 1-year extension with Beşiktaş. In July 2022, he signed a further 1-year extension.

International career

The early years of Hutchinson's international career included appearances at both the 2001 and 2003 FIFA World Youth Championships. He made his senior debut for Canada in a January 2003 friendly match against the United States. That same year, he appeared in the 2003 edition of the CONCACAF Gold Cup and would go on to appear in five subsequent editions in the following two decades (2005, 2007, 2009, 2011 and 2019). 

Canada reached the semi-finals of the 2007 CONCACAF Gold Cup, another match against the United States, which was the site of one of the most controversial moments in Hutchinson's career. With Canada down 2–1 in regulation time, Hutchinson scored a goal in the final minute of stoppage time, having received a ball that bounced off the head of American defender Oguchi Onyewu. However, the goal was ruled offside by referee Benito Archundia, as a result of which the United States won the game and proceeded to the final. Both then and subsequently, many believed that Archundia's call was incorrect.

On 17 December 2010, Hutchinson was awarded the Canadian Men's Player of the Year by the CSA for the first time in his career. Hutchinson was heavily favoured for this award in 2010 for his play with the national team, joining a well-known European club and becoming the first Canadian to win the Danish Superliga Player of the Year. Selected to the 2011 CONCACAF Gold Cup squad, Hutchinson exited the tournament following a 0–2 loss to the Americans at Ford Field after sustaining a knee injury. He was forced to miss the rest of the tournament.

For much of Hutchinson's career, Canada was not able to field a genuinely competitive international team, and qualification to the FIFA World Cup persistently eluded them. As part of the CONCACAF qualification process for the 2014 FIFA World Cup in Brazil, Canada was on the verge of reaching the final stage of CONCACAF qualification for the first time since 1998. Going into its final game of the third round against Honduras in San Pedro Sula on October 16, 2012, Canada needed only a draw to reach the fourth and final stage of qualification. Instead, the team was routed in an 8–1 victory for Honduras, its worst loss in almost thirty years. That game would come to be regarded as the lowest point in the team's history by many. Hutchinson was again named Canada Soccer's male player of the year to end 2012, and affirmed that he hoped to pursue another World Cup qualification, saying "It would still mean everything to me if I could be part of the team and give another go at it."

Hutchinson was once again awarded the 2015 Canadian Men's Player of the Year by the CFA, marking his fourth straight award and fifth in the last six years. He went on to win the title again in 2016 and 2017. However, Canada would not fare any better in attempting to qualify for the 2018 FIFA World Cup, failing to advance to the fifth round of CONCACAF qualification. Disillusioned and believing that his best years had been wasted with the team, Hutchinson would later say that "in my head, I was done. I wasn't coming back to Canada, I swear."

After declining to participate in 2016 and 2017 friendly matches and missing the 2017 CONCACAF Gold Cup, Hutchinson was persuaded to rejoin by coach John Herdman, newly arrived from Canada's much more successful women's national team. Herdman believed Hutchinson would add a valuable veteran presence to a team of up-and-coming talents like Alphonso Davies and Jonathan David. Upon his recall to the team in October 2018, he indicated he was looking to retire from the Canadian national team after the 2019 CONCACAF Gold Cup. He was named to the squad for that tournament on 30 May 2019.

Hutchinson however remained active for Canada, and in March 2021 he accepted a call-up for 2022 FIFA World Cup qualifiers against Bermuda and the Cayman Islands. This new cycle was far more successful than any he had seen before, and they reached the final stage for the first time in a quarter century. Hutchinson said "this time around we've got a team that is full of talent." On November 16, 2021, Hutchinson captained Canada to a 2–1 victory over Mexico at Commonwealth Stadium in Edmonton, which also marked his 90th appearance for his country, surpassing Julian De Guzman as the all-time appearance leader for the men's national team. On March 27, Canada officially qualified for the World Cup with a 4–0 victory over Jamaica at BMO Field in Toronto.

After he suffered a bone bruise that scuppered the beginning of his club season in the fall of 2022, there was doubt as to whether Hutchinson would be ready to participate in the World Cup. Herdman said it was "a tough situation for him. Because I think for all of us he just means so much to the team." However, he recovered sufficiently and in November 2022 he was named to Canada's 26-man squad for the 2022 FIFA World Cup. Acknowledging Hutchinson's importance to the national team through the preceding twenty years, TSN remarked that "the country's return to the World Cup is the crowning achievement in his incomparable career." Hutchinson was also the eldest outfielder to play at the 2022 World Cup. On 27 November, he played his 100th match for Canada in a 4–1 defeat against Croatia during the World Cup, becoming the first male Canadian to achieve this feat. In Canada's last match of the tournament, having already been eliminated, a would-be equalizing header from Hutchinson was tucked under the crossbar but failed to cross the goal line, as Canada were eventually defeated 2–1 by Morocco, failing to take any points from their group matches.

Personal life
Atiba Hutchinson is married to a French-Iranian woman named Sarah, whom he met while playing in Denmark. Together they have three sons, Noah (born 2015), Nava (born 2016) and Ayo Siyah (2017), all of whom were born in Istanbul. In April 2022, he joined the ownership group of League1 Ontario club Simcoe County Rovers FC.

Career statistics

Club

International

As of 2 February 2022. Canada score listed first, score column indicates score after each Hutchinson goal.

Honours
Copenhagen

 Royal League: 2005–06
 Danish Superliga: 2005–06, 2006–07, 2008–09, 2009–10
Danish Cup: 2008–09

PSV
KNVB Cup: 2011–12
Johan Cruyff Shield: 2012

Beşiktaş
Süper Lig: 2015–16, 2016–17, 2020–21
Turkish Cup: 2020–21
Turkish Super Cup: 2021

Individual
Danish Superliga Player of the Year: 2009–10
Canadian Player of the Year: 2010, 2012, 2014, 2015, 2016, 2017
CONCACAF Best XI: 2016
FC Copenhagen All Time Best XI - 100th Anniversary fan vote
Canadian Soccer Association: All-Time Canada XI

See also 
 List of men's footballers with 100 or more international caps

References

External links
 
 
 
 
 
 

1983 births
Living people
Canadian soccer players
Canadian sportspeople of Trinidad and Tobago descent
Association football midfielders
Canada men's international soccer players
2003 CONCACAF Gold Cup players
2005 CONCACAF Gold Cup players
2007 CONCACAF Gold Cup players
2009 CONCACAF Gold Cup players
2011 CONCACAF Gold Cup players
2019 CONCACAF Gold Cup players
2022 FIFA World Cup players
Canadian expatriate soccer players
Canadian expatriate sportspeople in Sweden
Canadian expatriate sportspeople in Denmark
York Region Shooters players
Toronto Lynx players
Östers IF players
Helsingborgs IF players
F.C. Copenhagen players
PSV Eindhoven players
Canadian Soccer League (1998–present) players
A-League (1995–2004) players
Allsvenskan players
Danish Superliga players
Eredivisie players
Expatriate footballers in Sweden
Expatriate men's footballers in Denmark
Expatriate footballers in the Netherlands
Canada men's youth international soccer players
Canada men's under-23 international soccer players
Canadian expatriate sportspeople in Turkey
Expatriate footballers in Turkey
Beşiktaş J.K. footballers
Süper Lig players
Black Canadian soccer players
Canadian expatriate sportspeople in the Netherlands
Soccer players from Brampton
Simcoe County Rovers FC owners
FIFA Century Club